The Forest of Dartmoor is an ancient royal forest covering part of Dartmoor, Devon, England.

A royal forest was an area reserved by the king for hunting, and William the Conqueror introduced the concept of forest law in England in the 11th century. Until 1204 the whole of Devon was a royal forest, but in that year King John agreed (subject to the payment by the county's commonality of a "fine" of 5,000 marks) to disafforest all of Devon "up to the metes of the ancient regardes of Dertemore and Exmore, as these regardes were in the time of King Henry the First". In other words, all of Devon except for Dartmoor and Exmoor was freed from forest law.

This disafforestation was confirmed by King Henry III in 1217, and in 1239 he granted the Forest of Dartmoor (and the Manor of Lydford) to his brother, Richard, Earl of Cornwall. From that date it technically became a chase, not a forest, though the name did not change. The next year, in a writ dated 13 June 1240, the king directed the Sheriff of Devon and twelve knights of the county to perambulate the Forest to record its exact bounds. This was because Richard had been in dispute with four knights who owned land adjoining the forest. The perambulation (known ever since as "the 1240 Perambulation") took place on 24 July 1240. It was around this time that the first of the Ancient Tenements,  such as Babeny, were founded within the Forest.

Richard's son, Edmund inherited the forest, but when he died in 1300 with no heir, the forest reverted to The Crown. King Edward II granted it to his favourite, Piers Gaveston, in 1308; on Gaveston's beheading in 1312, it reverted to The Crown again. Then in 1337 King Edward III granted the forest to Edward, the Black Prince, at the same time as he created him the first Duke of Cornwall, and today, the forest still belongs to the Duchy of Cornwall. A walk that follows the forest bounds as far as possible was set up in 1982.

The "Perambulations"
Although the original document detailing the route of the 1240 Perambulation has been lost, a number of near-contemporary copies still exist, differing only in spelling. A modern transcription of the places mentioned is as follows:

There was another perambulation of the forest bounds in 1608 which introduced a number of changes and added boundary points between the existing ones. The exact boundaries continued to be unclear or disputed until the later 19th century.

References

Sources

Dartmoor
History of Devon
Dartmoor